The Food Chopper War is a 1913 American silent film drama produced by Lorimer Johnson. The film stars Charles Clary, Adrienne Kroell, Timmy sheehan and Julius Frankenberg.  The film status is uncertain but a release flier survives which is now at the Margaret Herrick Library at the Academy of Motion Pictures Arts and Sciences, it was part of the Charles G. Clarke collection.

Plot
Two old country merchants, proprietors of the only two general stories in an old fashioned village, have been lifelong business enemies, each hating the other with a vengeance. One has a son, the other a daughter. These children help their fathers in their stores, but are secretly in love with each other. Eventually, the fathers learn of the secret love of their children, and each one raises a parental uproar, forbidding his child to see his enemy's "brat". The son and daughter make their plans, regardless of their elder's wrath and begin to save money, with which to marry and start up a store opposition to those of their parents.

A travelling man comes to town and sells a supply of patent food choppers to each of the rival stores. A price-cutting war results from the popularity of the chopper and by the time that the son and daughter have been united in marriage and have started a store of their own, the rivals are each selling the food chopper at a loss from 20 to 25 cents. The young people secretly buy up all the choppers from each store at a price away below cost. When the two men become aware of the fact that they are both out of "choppers", and cannot secure additional ones from the factory inside of six months, they also realize the successful ruse of their children. A truce is declared, bygones forgotten and the enemies's lifelong battle is happily ended.

Cast
 Charles Clary - Will Barlow
 Adrienne Kroell - Catherine Moore
 Timmy Sheehan - a messenger
 Julius Frankenburg - a drummer (billed as Julius Frankenberg)
George L. Cox - a clergyman
 Rose Evans - his wife

Notes

External links
 

1913 films
1913 drama films
American silent short films
1913 short films
Silent American drama films
American black-and-white films
1910s American films